Candlin is a surname. Notable people with the surname include:

David John Candlin (1928–2019), English physicist
Mitchel Candlin (born 2000), English footballer
Rosemary Candlin (born 1927), British computer scientist, wife of David John